A jar is a rigid, cylindrical or slightly conical container, typically made of glass, ceramic, or plastic, with a wide mouth or opening that can be closed with a lid,  screw cap, lug cap, cork stopper,  roll-on cap, crimp-on cap, press-on cap, plastic shrink, heat sealed lidding film, an inner seal, a tamper-evident band, or other suitable means.

Etymology
The English word "jar" originates from the Arabic word jarra, which means an earthen pot or vessel.

Creation 

Jars are sterilised by putting them in a pressure cooker with boiling water or an oven for a number of minutes. Glass jars are considered microwavable.

Utility  
Jars can be used to hold solids too large to be removed from, or liquids too viscous to be poured through a bottle's neck; these may be foods, cosmetics, medications, or chemicals. Glass jars—among which the most popular is the mason jar—can be used for storing and preserving items as diverse as jam, pickled gherkin, other pickles, marmalade, sun-dried tomatoes, olives, jalapeño peppers, chutneys, pickled eggs, honey, and many others.

Types 
 Bell jar - typically used in scientific laboratories to produce a vacuum; also used in Victorian times for display purposes
 Cookie jar - typically ceramic or glass, common in the United States, Canada, and United Kingdom
 Killing jar - used to kill captured insects
 Leyden jar - a historical electrical capacitor
 Specimen jar - an instrument used in anatomy to preserve specimens
 Apothecary jar - historically for storage of medicines; made of ceramics or more typically in modern centuries, clear glass. Typically cylindrical or with rotationally symmetric decorative curves, sometimes with a glass disc foot separated from the main body. Modern glass versions are also used for artistic display of the contents.

Modern glass food storage jars come in a variety of shapes, all of which have a circular opening on top for screwing on a lid:
 Economy round or wide mouth jars - tall but rotund cylinder slightly rounded at the top and bottom, relatively wide with a wide mouth, commonly used for sauces like a mayonnaise
 Paragon jars - tall and narrow cylinder, commonly used for pickled foods like olives
 French square or Victorian jars - roughly a small cube
 Spice jars - small cylinder or rectangular cuboid
 Hexagon or hex jars - regular hexagonal prism
 Mason jars - moderately tall cylinder typically used in home canning, sealed with a metal lid
 Kilner jar - similar to a Mason jar but sealed with rubber
 Straight-sided jars - cylinders with no neck. Squat straight-sided jars are suitable for creams which can be scooped out.

Ancient ceramic types include:
 Amphora - large, but typically holding under 50 L
 Pithos - very large, typically the size of a person and holding hundreds of liters

Gallery

Recycling 

Some regions[In what country?] have a legally mandated deposit refundable upon return of the jar to its retailer, after which the jar is recycled according to the SPI recycling code for the material.

See also 
 Canning
 Home canning
 Child-resistant packaging
 Hu (vessel)
 Jar opener
 Tamper-evident
 Tamper resistant
 The asterism Water Jar in the constellation Aquarius

References

External links

 
 

Storage vessels
Glass jars

ja:瓶